Luke Caldwell (born 2 August 1991) is a Scottish long distance runner.

Career 
Caldwell competed at the 2014 Commonwealth Games achieving 13th place in the 5000m and 14th in the 10,000m. A year later, he achieved his personal best of 28:29.61 minutes for the 10,000m at the 2015 Payton Jordan Invitational in Palo Alto, California. However, he has not yet beaten his personal best in the 5000m of 13:29.94 which he achieved in the 2013 Payton Jordan Cardinal Invitational in Palo Alto, California.

Personal life 
In 2012, Caldwell obtained a physics degree from Oxford University and then went on to study at the University of New Mexico, Albuquerque. By 2015, he had moved to western London to work as a science teacher and concentrate on athletics.

References

External links
 

1991 births
Living people
Alumni of the University of Oxford
Scottish long-distance runners
Commonwealth Games competitors for Scotland
Athletes (track and field) at the 2014 Commonwealth Games